Craugastor catalinae is a species of frogs in the family Craugastoridae. It is found in the Río Cotón drainage in the Pacific southwestern Costa Rica and on the Pacific slopes of Volcán Barú, western Panama. The specific name catalinae, rather obliquely, honors Karen R. Lips:  Spanish name "Catalina" corresponds to Danish name "Karen". Lips collected a part of the type series and has "contributed substantially to our knowledge of the Río Cotón drainage herpetofauna and the declining amphibian populations problem in lower Central America."

Description
Adult males measure  and adult females  in snout–vent length. The snout is subovoid to subelliptical from above and rounded in profile. The tympanum is distinct; it is round in males but ovoid in females. The fingers have discs and weak lateral keels. The toes have discs, fleshy fringes or broad flanges, and are moderately to heavily webbed. The dorsum is dark brown, olive, greenish gray, or gray-brown, and has a few darker spots. There is often a faint, light mid-dorsal pin stripe. The posterior thigh surface is dark brown and has yellow mottling. The venter is pale cream, with weak light brown punctations on the throat and chest.

Habitat and conservation
This species was once common in Costa Rica, but has now disappeared from much of its range; it has also declined in Panama. In addition to habitat loss, the decline is assumed to be caused by chytridiomycosis. It is known from some protected areas, including the La Amistad International Park.

References

catalinae
Frogs of North America
Amphibians of Costa Rica
Amphibians of Panama
Critically endangered fauna of North America
Taxa named by Jonathan A. Campbell
Taxa named by Jay M. Savage
Amphibians described in 2000
Taxonomy articles created by Polbot